Rinchnach is a river of Bavaria, Germany. It is a right tributary of the Rinchnacher Ohe in the village Rinchnach.

See also
List of rivers of Bavaria

References 

Rivers of Bavaria
Rivers of Germany